Bécouéfin  (also spelled Békuéfin) is a town in south-eastern Ivory Coast. It is a sub-prefecture of Akoupé Department in La Mé Region, Lagunes District.

Bécouéfin was a commune until March 2012, when it became one of 1126 communes nationwide that were abolished.

References

Sub-prefectures of La Mé
Former communes of Ivory Coast